Choclo orthohantavirus (CHOV) is a single-stranded, negative-sense RNA zoonotic New World hantavirus. It was first isolated in 1999 in western Panama. The finding marked the first time Hantavirus pulmonary syndrome (HPS) was found in Central America.

During this outbreak, a high seroprevalence was found among the general population, suggesting that this virus has an extremely low pathogenicity and causes sub-clinical to mild symptoms. This was confirmed in a study that infected hamsters with CHOV. All of the hamsters tested positive for CHOV, but none exhibited any symptoms.

Natural reservoir 
The virus was isolated from the northern pygmy rice rat in El Choclo in the Los Santos Province in western Panama.

Transmission 
Choclo orthohantavirus has not been shown to transfer from person-to-person. Transmission by aerosolized rodent excreta still remains the only known way the virus is transmitted to humans. In general, droplet and/or fomite transfer has not been shown in the hantaviruses in general, in either the hemorrhagic or pulmonary forms.

Epidemiology 
There were a total of eleven cases reported but only nine serologically confirmed cases of Choclo orthohantavirus found in this outbreak. A serologic survey of residents in the area revealed a 13% antibody prevalence. No person-to-person transmissions were found. There were no fatalities among serologically confirmed cases. There were three fatalities among those who tested negative for the virus. Before this outbreak, there were no documented cases of human hantavirus infections in Central America.

See also 
 Andes virus
 1993 Four Corners hantavirus outbreak

References

External links 
 CDC's Hantavirus Technical Information Index page
 Viralzone: Hantavirus
 Virus Pathogen Database and Analysis Resource (ViPR): Hantaviridae
 Occurrences and deaths in North and South America

Viral diseases
Hantaviridae
Rodent-carried diseases